Occupy Central may refer to:

 Occupy Central (2011–12)
 Occupy Central with Love and Peace
 The 2014 Hong Kong protests
 The Umbrella Movement, a related political movement in Hong Kong